Stubbs (April 12, 1997 – July 21, 2017) was a cat who was the honorary mayor of Talkeetna, Alaska, from July 18, 1997, until his death.

Stubbs was described as a tourist attraction, having been flooded with cards and letters, and drawing 30 to 40 tourists each day (most of whom were en route to other Alaska destinations, such as Denali) who hoped to meet "the mayor". His position was honorary, as the town is only a historic district.

Every afternoon, Stubbs went to a nearby restaurant and drank water laced with catnip out of a wineglass or a margarita glass.

Stubbs died in 2017 at the age of 20.

Early life
In 1997, Lauri Stec, manager of Nagley's General Store, found Stubbs in a box full of kittens in her parking lot. The owners were giving the kittens away; Stec chose "Stubbs" because he did not have a tail.

Career 
Stubbs was widely described as having been elected after a write-in campaign by voters who opposed the human candidates, but NPR pointed out that this could not have happened because "the tiny town has no real mayor, so there was no election." Nagley's General Store was used as Stubbs's "mayoral office" during his tenure.

Stubbs was featured in an effort to protest the 2014 United States Senate election in Alaska when people urged voters to write Stubbs in on the ballot. Stubbs was featured in a video criticizing both the Democratic and Republican candidates for Senate.

One opinion writer for the Alaska Dispatch News insisted that the whole story was false, and that Talkeetna did not have a cat mayor.

Later life 
In 2015, Stubbs was growing older and thus slowed down his public presence.  He died on July 21, 2017. His owners said that “He was a trooper until the end of his life.” Stubbs lived to the age of 20 years and three months.

Stubbs's owners have suggested that another family cat, Denali, may assume Talkeetna's "mayoralty".

Injuries 
On August 31, 2013, Stubbs was attacked by a dog. A crowd-funding page was set up to help pay his veterinary bills. Stubbs remained in the veterinary hospital for nine days before returning to the upstairs room of the general store. As a result, he was discouraged from roaming. Donations toward his care were received from around the world; the surplus was given to an animal shelter and to the local veterinary clinic.

Other incidents included Stubbs being shot by teenagers with BB guns, falling into a restaurant's deep fryer (which was switched off and cool at the time), and hitching a ride to the outskirts of Talkeetna on a garbage truck.

See also

 List of individual cats
 Non-human electoral candidates
 Tama, a Japanese cat who gained fame for being a station master and operating officer
 Bosco, a dog who defeated two humans to be elected honorary mayor of Sunol, California, in 1981, serving until 1994
 Catmando, a cat who served as joint leader of the British Official Monster Raving Loony Party
 Sergeant Stubby, an American dog who was promoted to the rank of sergeant through combat during World War I
 Nils Olav, a king penguin who served in the King's Guard of Norway from 1972 to his death in 1987, eventually gaining the rank of sergeant
 Nils Olav II, a king penguin who inherited his predecessor's name and rank, and was eventually promoted to colonel-in-chief and knighted
 Nils Olav III, a king penguin who inherited his predecessor's name, rank, and knighthood, and currently holds the rank of brigadier
 Wojtek, a bear enlisted in the Polish Army during World War II
 Sergeant Reckless, a Korean horse used as a pack animal in the conflict, and the highest ranking horse in the United States Marine Corps

References

1997 animal births
2017 animal deaths
Individual cats in politics
Individual cats in the United States
Matanuska-Susitna Borough, Alaska
Mayors of places in Alaska